Sir Frank Hartley  (5 January 1911 – 26 January 1997) was a pharmacist who became Dean of the School of Pharmacy, University of London (1962–76) and later Vice-Chancellor of the university from 1976–78.

Early life and education
He was born in Nelson, Lancashire, England, the son of Robinson King Hartley, a plumber, and his wife, Mary, née Holt. His father died when he was five. He attended Nelson Municipal Secondary School until 1926 and then wanted to be a teacher. However, as he was deaf in one ear he was refused a bursary and instead did a three-year apprenticeship at a Nelson pharmacy. After completing his apprenticeship he competed for, and won, a Jacob Bell scholarship to study for the diploma of pharmaceutical chemistry at the School of Pharmacy in London (now part of University College London), qualifying in 1932, under Prof Wilfred Herbert Linnell. He then worked there as demonstrator and studied for a degree in chemistry at Birkbeck College, University of London, graduating in 1936 with first-class honours.

Career
He initially taught at the School of Pharmacy whilst working for a PhD which he obtained in 1941. He then became chief chemist of the British laboratories of Organon, a company involved with steroids. From 1943 he was involved with maximizing penicillin production and also research. In 1946 he became director of research and scientific services at British Drug Houses (later merged with Merck KGaA) involving vitamin B12 and contraceptive steroids. In 1974 he became vice-chairman of the Medicines Commission and also served on various other committees.

In 1962 he became Dean of the School of Pharmacy, which had then become a school of the University of London. In 1965 he became President of the Royal Institute of Chemistry. He also took an active role in university affairs becoming Deputy Vice-Chancellor in 1973, and Vice-Chancellor in 1976. He was the first pharmacist to be an honorary member of the Royal Society of Physicians in 1979 and Royal College of Surgeons in 1980.

Personal life
On 22 December 1937 he married Lydia May England (1909/10–1996), daughter of Mark England, a carpenter, of Hadleigh, Essex. They had two sons; Peter became a canon of the Church of England and his son Frank Robinson Hartley was Vice-Chancellor of Cranfield University from 1989-2006.

He was appointed CBE in 1970 and was knighted for services to pharmacy in 1977. He died at Easenhall, near Rugby, Warwickshire.

See also
 List of Vice-Chancellors of the University of London

References

1911 births
1997 deaths
Alumni of the University of London
English pharmacists
Knights Bachelor
Vice-Chancellors of the University of London
Alumni of Birkbeck, University of London
People from Nelson, Lancashire